Laevimenes is a small neotropical genus of potter wasps which contains two species which live mainly in the Chaco and Cerrado biogeographical provinces.

References

 Giordani Soika, A. 1978. Revisione degli Eumenidi neotropicali appartenenti ai generi Eumenes Latr., Omicron (Sauss.), Pararaphidoglossa  Schulth. ed affini. Boll. Mus. Civ. Stor. Nat. Venezia 29: 1–420.

Biological pest control wasps
Potter wasps